The national symbols of England are things which are emblematic, representative or otherwise characteristic of England or English culture. Some are established, official symbols; for example, the Royal Arms of England, which has been codified in heraldry. Other symbols may not have official status, for one reason or another, but are likewise recognised at a national or international level.

Flags

Flora and fauna

Food and drink

Heraldry

Motor vehicles

Myth and folklore

People

Miscellaneous

See also

 List of cultural icons of England
 Symbols of the United Kingdom
 List of cultural icons of the United Kingdom

References

Bibliography

External links
England's National Symbols